Midnight is the debut EP from the American noise rock band '68. The album was originally self-released by the band online in December 2013 as a 7" vinyl record. Lead singer and guitarist Josh Scogin estimated that the original pressing of 1,500 copies sold out in about 8 or 9 hours. It was reissued by No Sleep Records on April 1, 2014 with new cover art parodying Nirvana's 1989 debut album, Bleach.

Track listing
 "Three is a Crowd" – 2:42
 "Third Time is a Charm" – 3:30

Personnel
 Michael McClellan – drums
 Josh Scogin – vocals, guitar

References

External links
 Midnight at Bandcamp

2013 EPs
'68 (band) EPs